Alternative World Games (known as Sports-A-Roni in North America) is a video game developed by Novotrade Software and published by Gremlin Interactive in 1987. It is a parody of the Epyx Games series. There are 8 different events which can be played.

Reception

See also 
Snoopy's Silly Sports Spectacular

References

External links 
Alternative World Games at MobyGames
Alternative World Games at World of Spectrum
Game review at ysrnry.co.uk

1987 video games
Amstrad CPC games
Appaloosa Interactive games
Commodore 64 games
Gremlin Interactive games
Sports video games set in Italy
Video games developed in Hungary
Video games set in Greece
Video games set in Mexico
Video games set in Venice
ZX Spectrum games